Broughton is a rural locality in the Charters Towers Region, Queensland, Australia.

Geography 
The locality is bounded to the north-west by the Flinders Highway, to the east by the Burdekin River, and to the south by the Broughton River.

The Great Northern railway passes through the locality, entering from the north-east (Dotswood) across the Burdekin River and exits to the west (Queenton). Sellheim railway station serves the locality.

History 
Broughton Road Provisional School opened circa 1895 and closed circa 1896.

Broughton Provisional School opened in 1905. On 1 January 1909, it became Broughton State School. It closed in 1930.

Facilities 
Sellheim Cemetery is on the south side of junction of the Flinders Highway with Harthorpe Road.

References 

Charters Towers Region
Localities in Queensland